Evan Lee (born November 23, 1993) is an American professional soccer player who plays for Greenville Triumph in the USL League One.

Career

Early career
Lee played four years of college soccer at Ohio Wesleyan University between 2012 and 2015.

Professional
Lee was signed by new United Soccer League club FC Cincinnati on February 15, 2016.

Lee played with USL side Richmond Kickers in 2017 and 2018.

On January 15, 2019, Lee joined USL League One side Greenville Triumph ahead of their inaugural season.

References

External links 
 
 
 
 

1993 births
Living people
American soccer players
Association football defenders
FC Cincinnati (2016–18) players
Greenville Triumph SC players
Ohio Wesleyan Battling Bishops men's soccer players
Richmond Kickers players
Soccer players from Ohio
Sportspeople from Toledo, Ohio
USL Championship players
USL League One players